Bill Eastmure (22 February 1914 – 28 November 1998) was an Australian rules footballer who played with Essendon and South Melbourne in the Victorian Football League (VFL).

Notes

External links 
		

1914 births
1998 deaths
Australian rules footballers from Victoria (Australia)
Essendon Football Club players
Sydney Swans players